Fuliya Devi Saday is a Nepalese politician. She is a member of Provincial Assembly of Madhesh Province from CPN (Maoist Centre). Saday is a resident of Kalyanpur, Siraha.

References

Living people
1978 births
Madhesi people
21st-century Nepalese women politicians
21st-century Nepalese politicians
Members of the Provincial Assembly of Madhesh Province
Communist Party of Nepal (Maoist Centre) politicians